Strogino may refer to:
Strogino District, a district of North-Western Administrative Okrug of Moscow, Russia
Strogino (Arbatsko-Pokrovskaya line), a station on the Arbatsko-Pokrovskaya line of the Moscow Metro, Moscow, Russia
Strogino (rural locality), a rural locality (a village) in Pskov Oblast, Russia